The Weston Dodgers are a defunct Tier II Junior "A" ice hockey team from Weston, Ontario, Canada. They were a part of the Ontario Provincial Junior A Hockey League. The franchise was previously known as the Woodbridge Dodgers from 1953 to 1962, and became the Weston Dodgers after that.

History
The Dodgers started out in Woodbridge, Ontario as part of the Toronto Metro Junior B Hockey League.  In 1962, the Dodgers were moved to Weston. They played reached the finals of the 1964 Sutherland Cup but lost to the Waterloo Siskins 4-1. With the formation of the Junior A Ontario Hockey Association, the Dodgers moved up in the OPJHL in 1972.

Moved in 1972, the Dodgers played five seasons of OPJHL Hockey.  Their best season was their first season where they finished in 6th place overall, but it is doubtful they ever made the playoffs after that year.  After four straight losing seasons, the Dodgers folded in 1977.

Season-by-season results

Playoffs
1973 Lost Quarter-final
Wexford Raiders defeated Weston Dodgers 4-games-to-1
1974 DNQ
1975 DNQ
1976 Lost Quarter-final
Weston Dodgers defeated Newmarket Flyers 3-games-to-2
Toronto Nationals defeated Weston Dodgers 2-games-to-none
1977 DNQ

Sutherland Cup appearances

 1955: Woodstock Warriors defeated Woodbridge Dodgers 4-2
 1964: Waterloo Siskins defeated Weston Dodgers 4-games-to-1

References

External links
OHA Website

Defunct ice hockey teams in Canada
Ice hockey teams in Ontario